Live 1.0 is an album recorded in 2005 by the French artist Calogero. It was his first live album and was released on August 22, 2005, and hit success in France and Wallonia, Belgium, topping the albums charts of these countries.

This live album was recorded on March 15 and 16, 2005 at the Forest National, in Brussels. It contains song from his first three albums, but particularly from 3 and Calogero. Three songs recorded as duets are available on this album : with Passi ("Face à la mer"), Raphaël ("Sur la route", song originally performed by Raphaël and Jean-Louis Aubert), and La Grande Sophie ("Du courage"). There is also a cover version of Dutch singer Dave's song, "Du côté de chez Swan".

The concert was also available as a DVD on November 7, 2005, and was certified triple platinum one month after it release, and finally diamond after four months.

The three songs released to promote the album were just promotional singles.

Track listing

 First CD

 Second CD

Charts and sales

CD

Weekly charts

Year-end charts

DVD

Weekly charts

Year-end charts

Certifications

References

Calogero (singer) albums
2005 live albums